Saphale railway station is a railway station at Saphale on the Western Line of the Mumbai Suburban Railway network.

Trains

The following trains halt at Saphale railway station in both directions:

 19215/16 Mumbai Central - Porbandar Saurashtra Express

References

Railway stations in Palghar district
Mumbai Suburban Railway stations
Mumbai WR railway division